Rajapalayam taluk is a taluk of Virudhunagar district of the Indian state of Tamil Nadu. The headquarters of the taluk is the town of Rajapalaiyam.

Demographics
According to the 2011 census, the taluk of Rajapalaiyam had a population of 347,318 with 173,202 males and 174,116 females. There were 1,005 women for every 1,000 men. The taluk had a literacy rate of 74.84%. Child population in the age group below 6 years were 15,736 Males and 14,890 Females.

References 

Taluks of Virudhunagar district